Leo A Daly, is an American architecture firm established in 1915 by Leo A. Daly, Sr. in Omaha, Nebraska. Aside from architectural design, the firm also works in planning, engineering, interior design and program management.

History 
As of 2006, the firm's portfolio included projects in 91 countries, and in all U.S. states. In 2006, the firm employed approximately 1200 people in 30 offices. It consistently ranks as one of the largest architecture, engineering and interior design firms in the United States, and is listed in BD World Architecture's top firms. They work in design for the federal government, health care, aviation, and hospitality.

Lockwood, Andrews & Newnam, Inc. (LAN) a subsidiary of Leo A. Daly Co., offers planning, engineering and program management services to a variety of client types. 

Architect Golden J. Zenon Jr. worked as a designer at Leo A Daly Co. early in his career, starting in 1955.

References

External links

Lockwood, Andrews & Newnam
Company Timeline, 1915 to 2007

Architecture firms of the United States
Architecture firms based in Nebraska
Companies based in Omaha, Nebraska
1915 establishments in Nebraska